Andrew Cassara is a singer-songwriter from Ottawa, Ontario.

Influences
Cassara expressed that his influences for the direction of his sound are Maroon 5, Justin Timberlake, Backstreet Boys, Charlie Puth.

Career

In 2018, Cassara headlined the Youth X Canada Tour, performing for and engaging with audiences at youth centres across Ontario in an effort to encourage young people to share their own stories and mental health struggles. He’s also performed in the US, South Korea, Singapore, Japan and Sweden at showcases, festivals, clubs, and conferences, and shared the stage with prominent Canadian and International artists Shawn Mendes, Chromeo, Tyler Shaw, Lauv and others.

Discography

Studio album

Extended play

Singles
2013: "Live Your Life"
2013: "Taking Chances"
2014: "I Know"
2015: "That's Some Crazy"
2016: "New Me No You"
2017: "Victim"
2018: "Fever"
2019: "Get Down"
2019: "Dancing Mono"
2020: "Bad Bad"

Guest appearances

References 

1995 births
Canadian child singers
Canadian pop singers
Living people
Musicians from Ottawa
21st-century Canadian male singers